Petrochori (Greek: Πετροχώρι meaning rock village) is a village in Achaea, Greece. It is part of the municipality of West Achaea. It is located 6 km south of Kato Achaia, and 25 km southeast of Patras. The population of Petrochori in 2001 was 177 for the village and 721 for the community, which consists of the villages Petrochori, Karya, Lampraiika, Logothetis, Veskoukaiika, Vythoulkas and Zampeteika. The nearest villages are Ano Achaia to the northeast and Elaiochori to the east.

Population

External links
 Petrochori GTP Travel Pages

See also

List of settlements in Achaea

References

Dymi, Achaea
Populated places in Achaea